Games men play is a 2006 Nigerian drama film directed by Lancelot Oduwa Imasuen.

Plot
The film looks at the indiscretions among several wealthy Lagosian couples. The main protagonist Tara (Kate Henshaw-Nuttal) decides to do a research on relationships for a TV show, centering her research on couples which include a television talk show host Abby (Monalisa Chinda); her boyfriend Richmond (Mike Ezuruonye) and his greedy woman on the side (Ini Edo); a housewife with a painful past (Chioma Chukwuka) and her husband (Bob-Manuel Udokwu), haunted by dark secrets; and another housewife (Uche Jombo) struggling with a wealthy, cheating husband (Jim Iyke) and his demanding mistress (Dakore Egbuson).

Cast
Kate Henshaw-Nuttal
Ini Edo
Chioma Chukwuka
Chinedu Ikedieze
Kalu Ikeagwu
Jim Iyke 
Dakore Egbuson
Uche Jumbo
Bob Manuel Udokwu
Benita Nzeribe
Michael Ezuruonye
Monalisa Chinda

Vivian Uche Eze

See also
 List of Nigerian films of 2006

References

External links
 

Nigerian drama films
2006 films
2006 drama films
English-language Nigerian films
Films set in the 2000s
Nigerian film actors
2000s English-language films